Huang Jie or Jie Huang may refer to:

 Huang Chieh (1902–1995), Kuomintang general, Governor of Taiwan Province
 Huang Jie (politician) (born 1993), Taiwanese politician
 Huang Jie (engineer), Chinese mechanical engineer